State Highway 39 (SH-39) is a  state highway located in Power and Bingham counties in Idaho. SH-39 runs from its southern terminus at Interstate 86 (I-86) in American Falls to its northern terminus at U.S. Route 26 (US-26) in Blackfoot. Between the two cities, it passes through the city of Aberdeen and the communities of Springfield and Pingree.

Route description
Idaho State Highway 39 begins at an interchange with Interstate 86 next to the American Falls Airport. The highway proceeds west, bypassing the community of American Falls. The road travels along the American Falls Dam, before bending northward, and traveling parallel to American Falls Reservoir. The highway continues, bending northeast, before bending back northward, and passing through the community of Aberdeen. The roadway continues north, before traveling northeast for a short distance, and turning north again. The route continues north, before bending eastward and proceeding. The highway proceeds eastward for several miles, before bending northeastward. The highway continues northeastward, and, after a long distance, passes the Rockford Municipal Airport. The road bends eastward, passing through the community of Moreland. The highway continues eastward to its eastern terminus, an intersection with U.S. Route 26.

Major intersections

See also

 List of state highways in Idaho
 List of highways numbered 39

References

External links

039
Transportation in Power County, Idaho
Transportation in Bingham County, Idaho